Sanid Beganović (21 January 1960 – 11 March 2009) was a Yugoslav and Serbian footballer who played as a winger.

Career
Born in Priboj, Beganović made a name for himself at Radnički Niš, amassing 118 appearances and scoring 11 goals in the Yugoslav First League (1981–1985). He was also a regular member of the team that reached the semi-finals of the 1981–82 UEFA Cup. After spending three seasons with Vojvodina, Beganović moved abroad to France and joined Le Mans in the summer of 1988. He later also played for Créteil, Évry, and Lyon-Duchère.

Death
On 11 March 2009, Beganović died due to heart attack during a court hearing in Novi Sad.

References

External links
 
 

Lyon La Duchère players
Association football midfielders
Évry FC players
Expatriate footballers in France
FK FAP players
FK Radnički Niš players
FK Vojvodina players
Le Mans FC players
Ligue 2 players
People from Priboj
Serbian footballers
US Créteil-Lusitanos players
Yugoslav expatriate footballers
Yugoslav expatriates in France
Yugoslav First League players
Yugoslav footballers
1960 births
2009 deaths